Non-explosive demolition agents are chemicals that are an alternative to explosives and gas pressure blasting products in demolition, mining, and quarrying. To use non-explosive demolition agents in demolition or quarrying, holes are drilled in the base rock as they would be for use with conventional explosives. A slurry mixture of the non-explosive demolition agent and water is poured into the drill holes. Over the next few hours the slurry expands, cracking the rock in a pattern somewhat like the cracking that would occur from conventional explosives.

Non-explosive demolition agents offer many advantages including that they are silent and do not produce vibration the way a conventional explosive would. In some applications conventional explosives are more economical than non-explosive demolition agents. In many countries these are available without restriction, unlike explosives which are highly regulated.

The active ingredient is typically calcium oxide "burnt lime" typically mixed with a little Portland cement and plausibly modifiers.

These agents are much safer than explosives, but they have to be used as directed to avoid steam explosions during the first few hours after being placed.

Many patents describe non-explosive demolition agents containing CaO, SiO2 and/or cement.

See also
Plug and feather
Explosive material
Mining
Quarry

References

Building engineering
Chemical engineering